ManaBus.com was an intercity coach service operator in New Zealand. The company was owned by Brian Souter's InMotion Group. ManaBus and Nakedbus ceased operation on 15 July 2018, with the bus fleets being sold to Ritchies Transport Holdings, part owner of rival coach company InterCity.

History
ManaBus.com commenced operating express coach services on the North Island of New Zealand on 21 November 2014. In May 2015 it took over Nakedbus. On 15 July 2018 ManaBus and Nakedbus ceased operation.

Corporate strategy
Advertised fares started at $1 (plus $1.99 booking fee), using a yield management model as employed by sister companies Megabus, OnniBus and PolskiBus. ManaBus.com operated at a high load factor using yield management pricing and large double decker buses to keep capital cost per seat and fuel burn per seat at low levels, similar to how airlines operate. Founder Brian Souter believed that bus journeys of up to six hours can compete with air travel.

Services
ManaBus.com operated 24 hours a day, 7 days a week across the North Island of New Zealand. Key routes include:
Auckland - Wellington (day services and a sleeper bus service)
Auckland - Whangarei to Paihia
Wellington - Palmerston North, Taupo, Rotorua, Hamilton to Auckland
Auckland - Napier
Auckland - Whitianga
Auckland - Tauranga
Auckland - Hamilton
Whangarei - Hamilton
Whangarei - Rotorua

Fleet 
ManaBus.com operated a fleet of Kiwi Bus Builders bodied Volvo B11Rs.

The buses were outfitted with leather reclining seats (or beds in the sleeper bus), air conditioning, toilet, seatbelts and free Wi-Fi.

References

External links
Company website

Bus companies of New Zealand
Transport companies established in 2014
Transport companies disestablished in 2018
2018 disestablishments in New Zealand
New Zealand companies established in 2014